François-Rosaire Paré (born 1949 in Longueuil, Quebec) is a Québécois author and academic specialising in the literature of cultural minorities, though He started his career as a professor of French Renaissance literature.

Paré lived in Montreal during his youth. After earning his Bachelor of Arts degree at the Université de Montréal, he pursued further studies in Buffalo, New York at SUNY. He would eventually settle in Ontario, first at St Catharines, then moving to the Kitchener-Waterloo region to teach at the University of Guelph. He was the Chair of the French Studies Department at the University of Waterloo from 2003-2010 and is now the Graduate officer for the department.

Awards and recognition

 1993: French non-fiction winner, Governor General's Awards, Les Littératures de l'exiguïté
 2003: French winner, Trillium Book Award, La distance habitée
 2009: Lifetime achievement award, Canadian Society for Renaissance Studies

Bibliography
 1992: Les Littératures de l'exiguïté (Le Nordir) 
 1994: Théories de la fragilité (Le Nordir) 
 2000: Traversées, with Francois Ouellet(Le Nordir) 
 2003: La distance habitée (Le Nordir) 
 2007: Le fantasme d'Escanaba (Nota Bene) 
 2008: Louis Hamelin et ses doubles, with Francois Ouellet (Nota Bene)

See also
 List of University of Waterloo people

External links
 University of Waterloo: François Paré profile, accessed 16 July 2006
  Maison de la poesie: François Paré profile, accessed 16 July 2006

1949 births
Living people
Canadian male non-fiction writers
Franco-Ontarian people
University at Buffalo alumni
Academic staff of the University of Guelph
Université de Montréal alumni
Academic staff of the University of Waterloo
People from Longueuil
Canadian non-fiction writers in French
Governor General's Award-winning non-fiction writers